Melisa Arévalo (born 9 January 1980) is an Argentine former professional tennis player.

Arévalo won 19 ITF tournaments during her career, four in singles and 15 in doubles. She made two WTA Tour main-draw appearances, both in doubles, at the 1999 Copa Colsanitas and the 2002 Casablanca Grand Prix.

ITF Circuit finals

Singles: 10 (4–6)

Doubles: 32 (15–17)

References

External links
 
 

1980 births
Living people
Argentine female tennis players
21st-century Argentine women